Khanali may refer to:
Xanalı, Azerbaijan
Xanlıqpəyə, Azerbaijan